The Miss Belgium 2015 was held on January 10, 2015, at the Plopsaland Theater in De Panne, Belgium. There were 30 contestants representing provinces and municipalities of Belgium.

The winner, Annelies Törös, Miss Antwerp, entered Miss Universe 2015. The first runner up, Leylah Alliët,  entered Miss World 2015.

Winner and runners-up

Special awards

Miss Congeniality (voted by contestants) – Kawtar Riahi Idrissi (East Flanders)
Miss Beach Babe – Charlotte Vanbiervlieti (West Flanders)
Miss Talent – Valentine Cesarone (Hainaut)
Miss Model – Stephanie Bola (Brussels)
Miss Elegance – Titsia Brabants (Antwerp)
Miss Charity – Michèle Roelens (West Flanders)
Miss Social Media – Titsia Brabants (Antwerp)
Public Award – Caroline Van Hoye (Brussels)

Candidates

Judges
The Miss Belgium 2015 final judges were:

Darline Devos –  President of Committee Miss Belgium
Annelien Coorevits – Miss Belgium 2007
Virginie Claes – Miss Belgium 2006
Daniel Dedave – Official photographer 
Barbara Gandolfi – Ex-Playboy model, comedian, businesswoman and fourth finalist of Miss Belgian Beauty 1999
Axel Hirsoux – Singer, contestant on the second season of The Voice Belgique

The American actor, Gary Dourdan, has been officially nommed as president of jury but he withdrew at the last minute.

Contestant notes
Stéphanie Bola, first runner-up of Miss Brussels, has Congolese origins on her father's side.
Titsia Brabants, Crown Card de Miss Antwerp, has Mexican origins on her mother's side. She is the niece of Mexican surfeur Coco Nogales.
Aurélie Hendrickx, first runner-up of Miss Antwerp, has been singer and member of Belgian pop group, Dalton Sisters, only, composed of her sisters, Laurine, Marie-Laure et Marie-Hélène. With her group, she is participated in a final of Eurovision junior with their song Verander de wereld en 2007.
Victoria Humblet, first runner-up of Miss Liège, has Philippian origins on her mother's side.
Kawtar Riahi Idrissi, Miss East Flanders, has Moroccan origins on her parents' side.
Anastasiya Liënko, second runner-up of Miss East Flanders, is of Ukrainian descent.
Xhulia Mucaj, second runner-up of Miss Antwerp, is born in Albania.
Emily Rabaut, Crown Card of Miss West Flanders, is the sister of Lisa Rabaut, Crown Card of Miss West Flanders 2013.
Valentina Paesano, Crown Card de Miss Antwerp, has Italian origins on her parents' side.
Jennifer Rosenberg, has Gambian origins on her mother's side.
Annelies Törös, Miss Antwerp, has dual citizenships Hungarian and Belgian.
Caroline Van Hoye, contestant of Miss Brussels, has Mauritian origins on her mother's side.

Crossovers 
Contestants who previously competed at other national beauty pageants:

Miss Brussels
2008 : : Stéphanie Bola

Miss Coast Belgium
2010: : Emily Rabaut (2nd Runner-up)
2011: : Leylah Alliët (2nd Runner-up)

Miss Élégance Belgique francophone 2013
2013: : Valentine Cesarone (Winner)

Miss Mons
2012: : Valentine Cesarone (Winner)

Miss International Belgium
2015: : Caroline Van Hoye (Winner)

Contestants who previously competed or will be competing at international beauty pageants:

Miss Universe
2015: : Annelies Törös (Top 15)

Miss World
2015: : Leylah Alliët

Miss International
2016: : Caroline Van Hoye

Miss Philippines Europe 
2013: : Victoria Humblet (Winner)

Mutya ng Pilipinas
2013: : Victoria Humblet (Top 20)
's representative

Miss Europe World
2015: : Caroline Van Hoye (Best Face)

Miss World Peace
2015: : Caroline Van Hoye

Miss Europe Continental
2016: : Valentine Cesarone (Top 10)
's representative

Miss Tourism Queen International
2015: : Caroline Van Hoye

Best Model of the World
2012: :  Malissia Sirica (Best Hope)

Miss Grand International
2016: : Kawtar Riahi Idrissi

Miss Supranational
2015: : Kawtar Riahi Idrissi
's representative

References

External links
Official website

2015
2015 in Belgium
2015 beauty pageants
January 2015 events in Europe
De Panne